Mental Maintenance is a studio album by a Jamaican reggae singer, Konshens, released on March 6, 2012, under Subkonshus Music/VPAL in the U.S. The album was released on February 28 in Jamaica at first.

This album is his first worldwide album as a solo singer although his Japan only album, Real Talk, was released in 2010.

According to Konshens, this album is about mood swings. In an interview for oonuyard.com, he says “The feel of the album is just as the name states. It is like experiencing the mood swings required to maintain, ease, settle and redirect one's mind. There is a song on the album for every situation”.

This album became No.1 of the Japan and the Germany iTunes reggae album charts. It also ranked inside the top ten of the iTunes charts in Switzerland, the Netherlands and New Zealand.

Track listing

References

External links
 vpreggae.com

Konshens albums
2012 albums